Plotnikov 1-y is a rural locality (a khutor) and the administrative center of Plotnikovskoye Rural Settlement, Danilovsky District, Volgograd Oblast, Russia. The population was 809 as of 2010. There are 19 streets.

Geography 
Plotnikov 1-y is located in steppe, 2.7 km from the right bank of the Medveditsa River, 26 km southwest of Danilovka (the district's administrative centre) by road. Beryozovskaya is the nearest rural locality.

References 

Rural localities in Danilovsky District, Volgograd Oblast